Frank Joseph Ortenzio Jr. (born February 24, 1951) is a former Major League Baseball first baseman. He also played two seasons ( and ) in Japan for the Nankai Hawks.

During his time with the Nankai Hawks, he was given the registered name, "Ohtenjoh (王天上)", which translates into the king above heaven. You would see this on scoreboards and in the newspaper. Normally foreign players in Japan are given names in katakana, but because his last name appeared close to Japanese sounds, the team decided to give him a kanji pictograph name.

Sources

Major League Baseball first basemen
Kansas City Royals players
Nankai Hawks players
Corning Royals players
Billings Mustangs players
San Jose Bees players
Jacksonville Suns players
Omaha Royals players
Denver Bears players
Hawaii Islanders players
American expatriate baseball players in Japan
Baseball players from California
Sportspeople from Fresno, California
1951 births
Living people
American Association (1902–1997) MVP Award winners
Arizona Instructional League Royals players